Farhan Zaidi (born November 11, 1976) is a Canadian baseball executive who is currently the President of Baseball Operations for the San Francisco Giants of Major League Baseball.

Zaidi is one of two Muslim executives in Major League Baseball. He was the first Muslim and first Pakistani-American general manager in Major League Baseball.

Early life
Zaidi was born on November 11, 1976 in Sudbury, Ontario, Canada, to a family of Pakistani ancestry. His parents, Sadiq and Anjum, raised four children: Zeeshan, Farhan, Noor, and Jaffer. Zaidi grew up in the Philippines after his family moved to Manila when he was four years old.

He has a Bachelor of Science degree from the Massachusetts Institute of Technology and a Doctor of Philosophy (PhD) in economics from the University of California, Berkeley. He briefly worked for the Boston Consulting Group and the Sporting News website between MIT and Berkeley.

Baseball

Oakland Athletics
While at Berkeley, Zaidi read the book Moneyball and said that it changed his life. He saw a job posting for a baseball operations position with the Oakland Athletics and sent out his résumé, beating out 1,000 other applicants for the job. He was a data analysis sabermetrics assistant when he started. His boss with the Athletics, Billy Beane, called him "absolutely brilliant" and credited him with the acquisition of Yoenis Céspedes.

For the 2013 season, Zaidi was promoted by the Athletics to the post of Director of Baseball Operations and added Assistant General Manager to his title in 2014.

Los Angeles Dodgers
On November 6, 2014, Zaidi was named by the Los Angeles Dodgers as their new general manager.

Under his watch as the Dodgers GM, the team made its first World Series appearance in 29 years in 2017, falling to the Houston Astros in seven games. The following year, they lost in five games to the Boston Red Sox in the 2018 World Series.

San Francisco Giants
On November 6, 2018, Zaidi accepted an offer to join the San Francisco Giants to become President of Baseball Operations. In 2021, he was voted the Sporting News Executive of the Year and the MLB Executive of the Year Award becoming the first person of South Asian descent to win either awards.

When Scott Harris left the Giants in 2022 to become the president of baseball operations for the Detroit Tigers, Zaidi hired Pete Putila to be the Giants new general manager.

Personal life
Zaidi is married to Lucy Fang, a fellow MIT graduate.

Though he grew up in the Philippines, Zaidi still considers himself Canadian. His family returned to Canada every other summer to visit family and friends; as a result, Zaidi became a fan of the Toronto Blue Jays and many of its star players, such as Jesse Barfield, Tony Fernandez and George Bell. Zaidi was in Grade 11 when he watched Joe Carter hit his game-winning walk-off home run in 1993 to win back-to-back World Series championships for the Jays.

References

External links
Athletics bio

1976 births
Living people
American sportspeople of Pakistani descent
Boston Consulting Group people
Canadian expatriates in the Philippines
Canadian Muslims
Canadian people of Pakistani descent
Canadian sports executives and administrators
Los Angeles Dodgers executives
Major League Baseball general managers
MIT School of Humanities, Arts, and Social Sciences alumni
Oakland Athletics executives
San Francisco Giants executives
Sportspeople from Greater Sudbury
Sportspeople from Manila
UC Berkeley College of Letters and Science alumni